Randall Marquise Lane (born October 15, 1976) is a former American football wide receiver in the National Football League and Arena Football League. He was signed Arizona Cardinals as an Undrafted free agent in 2000. He played college football at Purdue and Los Angeles Valley College. On March 24, 2002, Lane was waived by the Chicago Rush.

References

External links
Purdue Boilermakers bio

1976 births
Living people
Players of American football from Chicago
American football wide receivers
Purdue Boilermakers football players
Arizona Cardinals players
Chicago Rush players
Columbus Destroyers players